"Y'All Want a Single" is a song written and recorded by American nu metal band Korn for their sixth studio album, Take a Look in the Mirror. It was released as the album's third single in March 2004, chosen by fans through a poll on the band's official forum.

Overview

Lyrics
At a running time of three minutes and 17 seconds, the song contains 89 uses of the word "fuck" with the repeated line "Y'all want a single, say fuck that - fuck that fuck that", although the radio edit replaces the word "fuck" with "suck", as well as replacing "Fuck that shit" with "Suck on it."

Concept
In an interview with Metal Hammer in November 2003, guitarist James Shaffer said:

Music video
The video, directed by Andrews Jenkins, presents a mob of fans destroying a record store with statements about the music industry displayed throughout. The video begins with all of the members of Korn entering the record store and destroying all of the music CDs and tapes and dismantling the racks and shelves that they are stored on. As the video moves along, facts criticizing the music industry and major label companies flash across the screen. One caption announces the video itself cost $150,000 to make, a budget smaller than many major label releases at the time. They state opinions based on the idea that the corporate nature of the music industry is questionable.

Captions in the music video:

Track listing
UK Maxi-Single (promo)
 "Y'All Want a Single" – 3:17
 "Y'All Want a Single (Suck That Clean Version)" – 3:19

Charts

References

Korn songs
2003 songs
2004 singles
Immortal Records singles
Epic Records singles
Songs written by Reginald Arvizu
Songs written by Jonathan Davis
Songs written by James Shaffer
Songs written by David Silveria
Songs written by Brian Welch